The South East Coast Ambulance Service NHS Foundation Trust (SECAmb) is the NHS ambulance services trust for south-eastern England, covering Kent (including Medway), Surrey, West Sussex and East Sussex (including Brighton and Hove).  It also covers a part of north-eastern Hampshire around Aldershot, Farnborough, Fleet and Yateley. The service was made an NHS foundation trust on 1 March 2011.

It is one of ten ambulance services trusts providing England with emergency medical services, and is part of the National Health Service, receiving direct government funding for its role.

The service came into being on 1 July 2006, with the merger of the former Kent Ambulance Service, Surrey Ambulance Service and Sussex Ambulance Service.

About
Until March 2016, the chief executive of the trust was Paul Sutton, who was previously chief executive officer of Sussex Ambulance Service, and the trust's chair was Tony Thorne. On 14 March 2016, the BBC announced that Thorne had resigned, and that Sutton would be taking a leave of absence from the trust. At the request of the health regulator for England, Monitor, Thorne was replaced by Sir Peter Dixon who acted as the trust's interim chair. The current chair, David Astley was appointed in 2018.

The trust responds to 999 calls from the public and urgent calls from health professionals: in Kent and Sussex, it also provides non-emergency patient transport services (pre-booked patient journeys to and from health care facilities). In addition, the trust provides the crews and maintains the three ambulances of the Neonatal Transfer Service for Kent, Surrey and Sussex.

It serves a population of around 4.5million. During the financial year (2005–06) the three predecessor Trusts responded to about 460,000 emergency calls.

It provided paramedics to GP practices across the southeast to take on home visits for a pilot scheme until March 2017, when the scheme was suspended because of a shortage of paramedics.

Performance

In January 2015, it was reported that the trust had told paramedics to leave patients at A&E departments if they had not been admitted within 45minutes of arrival.  In March 2015, the trust's "immediate handover policy" which was invoked on 10 February 2015 for an hour (before being rescinded) was condemned by clinicians at Brighton and Sussex University Hospitals NHS Trust as "unsafe and likely to pose a notable increase to risk for patients in the emergency department".

In November 2015, it emerged that the trust had set up a project which ran from December 2014 to February 2015, where calls were transferred from the NHS 111 system and an additional ten minutes was allocated to the response time, which is part of the nationally agreed operating standards. This delayed the dispatch of ambulances to up to 20,000 patients.  It was condemned by NHS England for putting the "public at risk" because there was "no evaluation built into its design".

It was put into special measures in September 2016 after the Care Quality Commission rated it inadequate because of bullying, delayed response times and putting patients at risk. A report produced by Professor Duncan Lewis from Plymouth University in August 2017 described a culture of bullying, harassment and sexual predation.

SECAmb is under severe financial pressure and faces a £7.1million deficit.  Ambulance crews in the area will no longer be paid to interrupt meal breaks and attend to some types of emergencies.  Patients with breathing problems, car crash victims, patients with chest pains, seizures  or strokes, among others, face delayed response times.  Critics fear this will put lives at risk and worsen outcomes for some surviving patients.  Jon Ashworth blamed government financial pressure on the health service.  Critics complain money is prioritized over patient care.

In September 2017, the trust reached just 50.8% of red one calls within the target of eight minutes, and 39.9% of red two calls.  This was the lowest ever recorded by an ambulance service since May 2012.  There was also a decline in calls being answered within fiveseconds, from 72.4% in September 2016 to  48.6%.

In May 2018, the trust said it would need 400 more paramedics to meet the new ambulance performance standards. This could cost £20M a year.  In October the clinical commissioning groups (CCG) agreed to find an extra £10M a year for more ambulances and more staff, but the service still expected to need private ambulance services and staff overtime to meet its targets.

It was taken out of special measures in August 2019 after favourable inspection reports, particularly that there was now an open culture where patients, families and staff could raise concerns without fear, but it was banned by Ofsted from training new apprentices.

The trust's region is served by Air Ambulance Kent Surrey Sussex.

CQC performance rating
In its last inspection of the service in July 2019, the Care Quality Commission (CQC) gave the following ratings on a scale of outstanding (the service is performing exceptionally well), good (the service is performing well and meeting our expectations), requires improvement (the service isn't performing as well as it should) and inadequate (the service is performing badly):

See also
 Emergency medical services in the United Kingdom
 Paramedics in the United Kingdom
 Healthcare in Kent
 Healthcare in Surrey
 Healthcare in Sussex
 Healthcare in Hampshire

References

External links
 
 Inspection reports from the Care Quality Commission

NHS ambulance services trusts
NHS foundation trusts
Health in Kent
Health in Sussex
Ambulance services in England